The Dangerous Crew was an American hip hop band formed by Oakland, California rapper and producer Todd "Too Short" Shaw. The Dangerous Crew consisted of both live musicians and rappers: Stuart "Shorty B" Jordan (bass, guitar, drums), Ramone "Pee-Wee" Gooden (keyboards, drums, guitar), Anthony "Ant" Banks (keyboards, drum programming, mixing), Sean G (live drums), and rappers Too Short, Mhisani "Goldy" Miller, FM Blue, Dangerous Dame, Russell "Rappin' Ron" Royster, Ant Diddley Dog, Robert "Spice 1" Green Jr. and Damani "Father Dom" Khaleel. The Dangerous Crew also had an R&B group known as About Face, who appeared on a few of the later releases by Too Short.

Discography

Studio albums

Rappin' Ron & Ant Diddley Dog

References

External links
[ The Dangerous Crew] at AllMusic
The Dangerous Crew at Discogs

Hip hop groups from California
Musical groups from Oakland, California
Gangsta rap groups